"Here for You" is a 2015 single by the Norwegian DJ and record producer Kygo. It features the vocals from British singer and songwriter Ella Henderson. It is the vocal version of Kygo's previous track, "ID", which was released on 10 February 2015.

Track listing

Music video
The music video for "Here For You" was released on 29 September 2015. It was directed by Michael Maxxis and shot on location in Palm Springs, California. The video has received over 40 million views as of February 2018.

Charts

Weekly charts

Year-end charts

Certifications

Release history

References

2015 singles
2015 songs
Ella Henderson songs
Kygo songs
Song recordings produced by Kygo
Songs written by Ella Henderson
Songs written by Kygo
Number-one singles in Hungary
Sony Music singles